Kanthalia Union is one of the six union councils under Kathalia Upazila of Jhalakati District in the Barishal Division of southern region of Bangladesh.

Geography 
Kanthalia Union is situated at the Kathalia Sadar of Kathalia Upazila. It shares borders with Panchanoanda Canal to the north, Hetalbuniya-Amua Road located in the south, to the east Bishkhali River, to the west Majhibari Canal.

Kanthalia Union has an area of 8324 acres.

Canal and River 

 Bishkhali River
 Boro Kanthalia Canal
 Aura Canal

Administration 
Kanthalia Union is the 4th Union Parishad Under Kathalia Upazila.The administrative activities of this union is under Kanthalia Union Parishad. This is included in the 125 No. Electoral Area Jhalakathi-1 of National Parliament.

At present, there is 13 wards under Kanthalia Union.The administrative activities of this union is under Kanthalia Union Parishad.

Demographics 
According to Census-2011, The total population of Kanthalia Union is 19,333.Among them number of male is 9376 and number of female is 9957.Number of total family is 5,082.

Village-wise Population

Educational Institutions 
According to the Census-2011, the literacy rate of Kanthalia Union is about 75%.

Number of Educational Institution 

 College-01
 Primary School-11
 High School-04

Agriculture 

The major crops of these area are Paddy, Betel Nut, Pulses, and grains of summer.

Economics 
The main occupations of the people of this area are Business and Service Holding. Other occupations are fish farming, fish hunting, animal husbandry, poultry rearing etc.

Transportation

Roadway 
Road communication has improved significantly in recent days. People can travel Kanthalia by bus or private car from Jhalokati, Bhandaria, Barisal, Pirojpur directly.

There is bus service from Gabtoli, Sayedabad, Chattogram and Khulna.

Waterway 
Water transport is a major attraction in this area. Numerous rivers and canals force the inhabitants to use boats as the main medium of transportation. People can travel at a cheap cost by boats and various types of engine boats. Kanthalia is famous for beautiful rivers, canals and islands. Tourists can find it enjoyable to travel Kanthalia through boats, launches and steamers. People can travel from main Inland Ports to Kanthalia River Port directly.

Places of interest

Choilar Chor (Sonneratia Island) 
Beside the Bishkhali river of Kathalia Upazila, there is an island in Hetalbuniya village named "Choilar Chor". It is an island of about 30.61 acre area. There are a lot of Choila tree (Mangrove Apple Tree) in that island; that's why the island was named after it. There is scenic landscape and picnic spot for tourists.

Markets

See also 
Upazilas of Bangladesh
Districts of Bangladesh
Divisions of Bangladesh

References

External links 

Unions of Kathalia Upazila
Jhalokati District